Aberdare Athletic Football Club were a Welsh football club founded in 1893 and based in Aberdare. They joined the Football League in 1921 but were replaced by Torquay United after failing to be re-elected in 1927.

History

Founded in 1893, Aberdare were Welsh Cup runners-up, in 1903–04 1904–05 and 1922–23. In 1920–21, they joined the Welsh Section of the Southern League and finished runners-up in their first season. That gained them entry to the Football League Third Division South in time for 1921–22.

Aberdare spent six seasons in the League, with their best season being 1921–22, when they finished 8th. In 1926, Aberdare merged with nearby Aberaman Athletic. The first team continued to compete in the Football League under the name Aberdare Athletic, while the reserve team played in the Welsh League under the name Aberdare & Aberaman Athletic.

However, in the next season, 1926–27, Aberdare Athletic finished bottom of the Third Division South and failed to gain re-election to the League, with Torquay United taking their place. Aberdare's loss of their Football League place was controversial. In the first ballot, Aberdare and Southern League side Torquay, the latter having previously applied to join the League in 1923, tied with 21 each. That round of voting was marred by controversy as there was reported to be one spoilt ballot paper (for Aberdare?). Aberdare's secretary claimed that one of the scrutineers was "an interested party".  Aberdare lost the second ballot with 19 votes to Torquay's 26; fellow League side Watford, who had finished second-bottom, were comfortably re-elected with 44 votes. The merged club fully renamed themselves as "Aberdare & Aberaman Athletic", and rejoined the Southern League.

However, the merged club only survived for another year, and in 1928, the Aberaman faction split away to re-form Aberaman Athletic, while the Aberdare half folded. After World War II, in 1945, Aberdare & Aberaman Athletic was re-formed, but that side also split into two, in 1947; Aberdare Town F.C. club continue to play in the Welsh Football League.

The club had several different team colours during their existence. Their membership of the Football League coincided with that of a team from another Welsh town, Merthyr Town.

Managers
The following were managers around the time the team was Football League side:
William Lot, June 1920 – March 1922
Frank Bradshaw, May 1923 – April 1924
Sydney Beaumont, 1924–1927
Harry Hadley, November 1927 – April 1928

History
Welsh Football League
Winners (4): 1904–05, 1908–09, 1911–12, 1920–21

League and Cup history

References

External links

 
Former English Football League clubs
Defunct football clubs in Wales
Defunct English Football League clubs
Southern Football League clubs
Association football clubs established in 1893
Association football clubs disestablished in 1928
Welsh football clubs in English leagues
1893 establishments in Wales
1928 disestablishments in Wales
Sport in Aberdare
South Wales League clubs